Greg Olsen may refer to:
Greg Olsen (American football) (born 1985), American football sportscaster and former tight end
Gregory Olsen (born 1945), American entrepreneur, engineer, scientist and space tourist

See also
Gregg Olsen (born 1959), American crime author
Greg Olson (disambiguation)